Svilar is a surname. Notable people with the surname include:

 Michael Svilar (born 1969), Australian rules footballer
 Mile Svilar (born 1999), Belgian footballer
 Ratko Svilar (born 1950), Serbian footballer

Serbian surnames